Crapaud is a rural municipality in Prince Edward Island, Canada. It is located north of Victoria in the township of Lot 29.

Demographics 

Businesses 

 Anna's Country Kitchen
 Atlantic Guns & Gear
 Bakin Donuts
 Canada Post
 Crapuad Public Library
 Harvey's General Store
 Handyman Repair
 Larkin Farms
 Pharmachoice
 Red Rooster Restaurant
 Scotiabank
 South Shore Actiplex

Crapaud Exhibition 
The town of Crapaud hosts its own annual exhibition with notable events such as the Tractor Pulls, in which contestants build or modify tractors in order to pull as much weight as possible over a short distance. Some other events that can be seen are barrel racing, tractor races, and a potato peeling contest. The event is held every summer.

References 

Communities in Queens County, Prince Edward Island
Rural municipalities in Prince Edward Island